Michael Joseph Pucci (born 1 June 1963) is a former American–Australian politician who served in the Queensland Legislative Assembly from 2012 to 2015, representing the seat of Logan. He was born in the United States, and served in the U.S. Marine Corps for 20 years before immigrating to Australia. Pucci represented the Liberal National Party while in parliament, but in 2017 began working for One Nation as its campaign director for the next state election. Before being removed from One Nation amidst bullying allegations and poor performance ratings in the previous elections.

Personal life 
Born in Kenosha, Wisconsin, U.S., on 1 June 1963, Pucci is the youngest of eight children and was raised in Wisconsin, United States by his mother. When he was old enough, he enlisted in the United States Marine Corps, which started a 20-year career that took him to postings throughout the world including Australia, the US, and the Middle East.

Pucci studied at Coastal Carolina Community College in North Carolina and St. Leo's College of Florida and has qualifications in leadership, management, training, communications and administration management.

Pucci met his wife Anna during a posting to Brisbane. He later immigrated to Brisbane, Queensland after retiring from the US Marine Corps and became an Australian citizen. Prior to entering politics, Pucci worked as an executive manager in the facilities maintenance industry, loss prevention/assets protection officer, bartender, janitor, dealership lot attendant, paperboy. Pucci is an active member of the Greenbank RSL, Australian American Association and the Building Services Contractors Association.

Military service 
Pucci served twenty years' active service in the United States Marine Corps and is a veteran of the Gulf War. Whilst in the USMC, Michael achieved the rank of Gunnery Sergeant. His Decorations include 3 Navy and Marine Corps Commendation Medals (NMCM), 3 Navy and Marine Corps Achievement Medals (NCAM), 6 Good Conduct Medals (GCM), National Defense Service Medal (NDSM), Southwest Asia Service Medal (SWA) with three stars for service in three campaigns (Defense of Saudi Arabia, Liberation and Defense of Kuwait, Southwest Asia Cease-Fire), Kuwait Liberation Medal (KLM – Saudi Arabia), Kuwait Liberation Medal (KLM – Emirate of Kuwait). Ribbons: 2 Navy Unit Commendations (NUC), 3 Meritorious Unit Commendations (MUC), Sea Service Deployment Ribbon with 2 stars, Marine Corps Recruiting Ribbon.

Politics
Pucci was elected to the seat of Logan at the 2012 Queensland state election. He was appointed to the Parliamentary Education and Innovation Committee on entering parliament, and then in February 2013 was promoted to sit on the Parliamentary Ethics Committee. Pucci is the first American to be elected as a member of parliament in Queensland and the first U.S. Marine to be elected to Parliament in Australia. On 22 November 2013, Pucci was further appointed to the Parliamentary Crime and Misconduct Committee. He was defeated by Labor's Linus Power at the 2015 election.

On 30 January 2017, Pucci became the third former Liberal National member to defect to One Nation, being appointed state campaign director. Pucci told The Courier-Mail he believed One Nation wanted to look after the best interests of Queenslanders.

References

External links

1963 births
Living people
American emigrants to Australia
United States Marine Corps personnel of the Gulf War
Coastal Carolina University alumni
Liberal National Party of Queensland politicians
Members of the Queensland Legislative Assembly
Military personnel from Wisconsin
Former United States citizens
Politicians from Kenosha, Wisconsin
Saint Leo University alumni
United States Marines
21st-century Australian politicians